{{DISPLAYTITLE:C18H28N2O}}
The molecular formula C18H28N2O (molar mass: 288.44 g/mol, exact mass: 288.2202 u) may refer to:

 Bupivacaine
 4-HO-DBT (4-Hydroxy-N,N-dibutyltryptamine)
 4-HO-DSBT
 Levobupivacaine
 Bay R 1531